The 1998–1999 international cricket season was from September 1998 to April 1999.

Season overview

September

India in Zimbabwe

October

Australia in Pakistan

1998 ICC KnockOut Trophy

November

Coca-Cola Champions Trophy 1998-99

Zimbabwe in Pakistan

England in Australia

West Indies in South Africa

December

India in New Zealand

January

Carlton and United Series 1998-99

Pakistan in India

February

South Africa in New Zealand

1998–99 Asian Test Championship

March

Australia in the West Indies

Pakistan in Bangladesh

Pepsi Cup 1998-99

Meril International Cup 1998-99

April

Coca-Cola Cup 1998-99

References

 
1998 in cricket
1999 in cricket